Lew II - Polish coat of arms, used by several genera. Two of them were families from the region of Kaszuby. Coat of arms "Lew II" is a variant of the coat of arms "Leo".

Blazon 
Description of emblem, proposed by Alfred Znamierowski: Gules lion rampant or. Crest - three ostrich feathers. Mantling gules lined or.
Modifications
Mentioned in Hzhanski differences in Tables coat of arms "Krupski". No color, he was quoted as Emilian Seligo-Zhernitsky, as the emblem of "Shada" and "Shadyn-Bozhishkovskih of Kashuba". Other branches of genus used a coat of arms "Bozhyshkovski", "Bozhyshkovski III ", "Lodz" could also use Coat of arms "Sas".

Below members of the Lew II Clan 
 Tadeusz Gaile specifies the list of the coat of arms genus: Krupski, Vysk, Zarembenski. Vysk - this is one of the surnames Bozhishkovski, but Przemyslaw Pragert argues that wore this coat of arms family, which used the coat of arms "Bozhishkovski".
 Families Kashubian: In this genus has been used the pseudonym "Hadyn" or "Shada". More - Pomeskie.

Gallery

See also 
 Polish heraldry
 Heraldry
 Coat of arms
 List of Polish nobility coats of arms

References 
 Tadeusz Gajl, "Herbarz polski od średniowiecza do XX wieku (ponad 4500 herbów szlacheckich 37 tysięcy nazwisk 55 tysięcy rodów)", L&L, 2007 r. , s. 196, 406-536 (in Polish);
 Alfred Znamierowski, Paweł Dudziński "Wielka księga heraldyki", Świat Książki, Warszawa, 2008 r. , s. 104-108 (in Polish);
 Przemysław Pragert, "Herbarz rodzin kaszubskich", BiT, 2001 r.  (9788391985267), T. 1 s. 47, 143 (in Polish);

External links
 "Polish Armorial Middle Ages to 20th Century", Tadeusz Gajl, Gdańsk-2007 r. (in Polish)

Polish coats of arms